Ipecac may refer to:

 Syrup of ipecac, an emetic drug
 Carapichea ipecacuanha, the plant from which syrup of ipecac is derived
 Ipecac Recordings, an American record label
 Ipecac (album)